Lake Vrutak is artificial reservoir on the Trebišnjica river in Popovo Polje, near Hutovo village, Bosnia and Herzegovina. The lake serves as compensation and storage basin for Pump-Storage Hydroelectric Power Plant "Čapljina".

Hydropower and irrigation system
Lake Vrutak is the last and smallest of three artificial reservoirs in hydroelectric power plant system Trebišnjica - HES "Donji Horizonti", and serves as compensation basin for Pump-Storage Hydroelectric Power Plant "Čapljina". Other two being Bilećko Lake, the first and largest, and flow-regulation (compensation) basin Trebinjsko Lake just upstream of Trebinje.

See also 
Svitavsko Lake
Hutovo Blato
Popovo Polje
Trebišnjica
Neretva
Čapljina Hydroelectric Power Station
List of lakes in Bosnia and Herzegovina

References

Vrutak
Ravno, Bosnia and Herzegovina
Popovo Polje
Trebišnjica
Lower Horizons Hydroelectric Power Stations System
Trebišnjica river damming and regulation controversy